Ngô Văn Chiêu (28 February 1878 – 1932) was the first disciple of Đức Cao Đài. His religious name is Ngô Minh Chiêu.

Life 
He was born in 1878 and raised by his aunt. He developed an interest in Chinese folk religion during this period. Later he served in the colonial bureaucracy and developed a fascination with spiritism. He declined his appointment as the first Caodaiist Pope and was not involved in the official establishment of Caodaiism in 1926. Instead, he chose to withdraw to a life of seclusion. Thus, the role went to Venerable Lê Văn Trung, who accepted on the condition that his title be Acting Pope.

In 1926, Lê Văn Trung and over two hundred others signed the "Declaration of the Founding of the Cao Đài Religion"; Chieu was not among the signers. He had accepted another entity as Đức Cao Đài and is credited as founder of the Chiếu Minh sect of Caodaiism. He died at 3:00 PM, 18-4-1932.

References

External links
Cao Dai page at Religious Movements
Partial at Britannica
Music site mentioning him

1878 births
1932 deaths
Vietnamese Caodaists
Founders of new religious movements
Date of death missing